Alexandru Valentin Neacșu (born 9 February 2000) is a Romanian professional footballer who plays as a goalkeeper for FC Voluntari. He made his debut in Liga I on 9 August 2021, in a match between FC Voluntari and CS Universitatea Craiova, ended with the score of 0-3.

References

External links
 
 Valentin Neacșu at lpf.ro

2000 births
Living people
Footballers from Bucharest
Romanian footballers
Association football goalkeepers
Liga I players
FC Voluntari players
Liga III players